The 18th congressional district of Illinois covered central and western Illinois, including all of Jacksonville and Quincy and parts of Bloomington, Peoria, and Springfield. It was last represented by Republican Darin LaHood, who took office in September 2015 following a special election.

Republican Aaron Schock previously represented the district from January 2009 until his resignation in March 2015. Darin LaHood is the son of Schock's predecessor, Ray LaHood, and was reelected in 2016, 2018, and 2020.

Abraham Lincoln served much of the area that now lies within the 18th district for a single term; it was numbered as the 7th district at the time. It also contains most of the territory that was represented by future United States Senate Minority Leader Everett Dirksen (1933-1949, when it was the 16th district) and longtime House Minority Leader Bob Michel (1957-1995).

From 1949 to 2015, the district was always represented by an attendee or graduate of Bradley University. Due to reapportionment after the 2020 U.S. census, the 18th district was eliminated ahead of the 2022 elections.

2011 redistricting
The district covered parts of McLean, Peoria, Sangamon, Stark and Tazewell counties, and all of Adams, Brown, Cass, Hancock, Logan, Marshall, Mason, McDonough, Menard, Morgan, Pike, Schuyler, Scott and Woodford counties, as of the 2011 redistricting which followed the 2010 census. All or parts of Bloomington, Chatham, Jacksonville, Lincoln, Macomb, Morton, Normal, Peoria, Quincy and Springfield are included. The representatives for these districts were elected in the 2012 primary and general elections, and the boundaries became effective on January 5, 2013.

Future 
Due to Illinois losing population in the 2020 United States census, the district was eliminated in January 2023.

Recent statewide election results

List of members representing the district

Recent election results

* Write-in and minor candidate notes: In 1994, write-ins received 955 votes.  In 1998, write-ins received 2 votes. In 2008, Green Party candidate Sheldon Schafer received 9,857 votes.  In 2010, Schafer received 11,256 votes.

2008

Ray LaHood decided not to seek re-election in 2008 and was chosen by Barack Obama to serve as U.S. Secretary of Transportation. Illinois State Representative Aaron Schock of Peoria won the seat for the Republicans in the November 4, 2008 election. His main opponent was Democrat Colleen Callahan, of Kickapoo, a radio and television broadcaster. Green Party candidate and educator Sheldon Schafer, of Peoria, was in a distant third place on the ballot.

2010

2012

2014

2015 special election

2016

2018

2020

Historical district boundaries

See also

 Illinois's congressional districts
 List of United States congressional districts

References
Specific

General
 
 
 Congressional Biographical Directory of the United States 1774–present

External links
 2006 election from The Washington Post
 18th District census profile, 2006
 18th District Fact Sheet from the United States Census Bureau
  
 Campaign contributions from OpenSecrets.org

18
Congressional District 18
Congressional District 18
Congressional District 18
Constituencies established in 1873
1873 establishments in Illinois
Constituencies disestablished in 2023
2023 disestablishments in Illinois